The North Carolina General Assembly of 2003–04 was the 145th session of the North Carolina General General Assembly.  The assembly is a bicameral body including a House of Representatives and Senate.  They both met in Raleigh, North Carolina in 2003 and 2004.  Members of this North Carolina General Assembly were elected on November 5, 2002. The 2002 legislative elections were conducted under an interim redistricting map following the 2000 census; a more permanent redistricting map was passed in November 2003 for use through 2010.

House of Representatives
The North Carolina State House, during the 2003–2004 session, consisted of 60 Democrats and 60 Republicans; consequently, Democratic and Republican co-speakers shared leadership of the body.  The representatives included 29 women, 18 African Americans, one Native American, and one Hispanic and Latino American.

Note:  Rep. Michael P. Decker changed party affiliation September 16, 2003. Rep. Alex Warner changed party affiliation August 20, 2004.

House leaders

 Permanent Democratic Caucus Chair: Edd Nye (22nd district)

House members

Notes

Senate members
The North Carolina State Senate, during the 2003–2004 session, consisted of 28 Democrats and 22 Republicans.

Senate leaders

 Permanent Democratic Caucus Chair: R. C. Soles, Jr.
 Democratic Caucus Secretary: Charles W. Albertson
 Secretary of Republican Caucus: Phil Berger

Senate members

↑: Member was first appointed to office.

Notes

References

2003-2004
General Assembly
General Assembly
 2003
 2003
2003 U.S. legislative sessions
2004 U.S. legislative sessions